Meleh Shitab (also Romanized as Meleh Shītāb) is a village in Tayebi-ye Garmsiri-ye Shomali Rural District, in the Central District of Landeh County, Kohgiluyeh and Boyer-Ahmad Province, Iran. At the 2006 census, its population was 80, in 16 families.

References 

Populated places in Landeh County